Luigia Coccia S.M.C, is an Italian Roman Catholic nun and missionary, one of the first seven women appointed members of the Congregation for Institutes of Consecrated Life and Societies of Apostolic Life the second highest-ranking department of the Roman Curia, the administrative institution of the Holy See since 8 July 2019, when was appointed by Pope Francis.

On 21 September 2016 she was elected the new Superior General of Comboni Missionary Sisters, succeeding Luzia Premoli.

References 

Living people
21st-century Italian Roman Catholic religious sisters and nuns
Women officials of the Roman Curia
Superiors general
Comboni Missionary Sisters
Italian Roman Catholic missionaries
Female Roman Catholic missionaries
Members of the Congregation for Institutes of Consecrated Life and Societies of Apostolic Life
Year of birth missing (living people)
21st-century Christian nuns